Grazer may refer to:
grazer, an animal that grazes
Grazer, a native or inhabitant of Graz
GRAZER, the shoegaze band GRAZER

Astronomy
Earth Grazer, Earth-grazing fireball that enters the Earth's atmosphere and leaves again
Mercury grazer, asteroid whose orbit crosses that of Mercury
Outer-grazer and inner-grazer, schemes of Sun Orbits

Business
Grazer Autorenversammlung, Austrian writers' association
Grazer Gruppe, Austrian writers group
Grazer Wechselseitige Versicherung, Central European insurance company

Other uses
Grazer (surname)
Grazer AK, Austrian sports club
Grazer Kunsthaus, Austrian museum
Grazer Oper, Austrian opera house and opera company

See also
Grazer Schloßberg, Austrian hill topped by a castle